Lieutenant general is a three-star general officer rank in the Indian Army. It is the second-highest active rank in the Indian Army. Lieutenant generals rank above the two-star rank of Major General and below the four-star rank of General, which is held by the Chief of the Army Staff.

The equivalent rank in the Indian Navy is Vice Admiral and in the Indian Air Force is Air Marshal.

Officers in the rank of lieutenant general hold important appointments at the army commands and at the army headquarters.

Army commanders (C-in-C grade)

Senior lieutenant generals who are in the C-in-C grade (army commanders), are considered to be in a grade higher than other lieutenant generals. They hold the most senior appointments like the Vice Chief of the Army Staff and the heads of the seven army commands (styled general officer commanding-in-chief). The seven GOC-in-C appointments are:

 General Officer Commanding-in-Chief Central Command 
 General Officer Commanding-in-Chief Eastern Command 
 General Officer Commanding-in-Chief Northern Command 
 General Officer Commanding-in-Chief Southern Command 
 General Officer Commanding-in-Chief South Western Command 
 General Officer Commanding-in-Chief Western Command 
 General Officer Commanding-in-Chief Army Training Command

Insignia
The badges of rank have a crossed sword and baton and Ashoka emblem above.

A lieutenant general wears gorget patches which are crimson patches with three golden stars. Army commanders in the C-in-C grade have additional oak leaves under the three golden stars.

Order of precedence
A lieutenant general in the C-in-C grade ranks at No. 23 on the Indian order of precedence, along with vice admirals of the Indian Navy and air marshals of the Indian Air Force in the C-in-C grade. The other lieutenant generals rank at No. 24 in the order of precedence.

Lieutenant generals in the C-in-C grade are at the apex pay scale (pay level 17), with a monthly pay of ₹225,000 (US$3,100). Other lieutenant generals, in the HAG+ pay scale (pay level 16) draw lesser, depending on the years in service. However, since they should not draw equivalent or more than the next higher level, the remuneration is capped at ₹224,000.

See also
 List of serving generals of the Indian Army
 Army ranks and insignia of India
 General officer commanding

References

India Army
Indian Army
Indian generals
Military ranks of the Indian Army
Three-star officers